Ziv "Kojo" Cojocaru (born 1977 in Beer-Sheva, Israel) is an Israeli composer, conductor and arranger who serves as Head of Composition, Conducting and Music Theory Department at the Jerusalem Academy of Music and Dance and as Conductor in Residence of the Israel Sinfonietta Orchestra.

Biography
Cojocaru received his master's degree in Composition with honors at the Jerusalem Academy of Music and Dance studying with Zvi Avni and  Haim Permont. He also received his master's degree in Orchestral Conducting with honors at the  Academy, studying with Yevgeny Zirlin. Cojocaru  completed his doctorate in composition (Ph.D) at Bar-Ilan University. He also attended composition master classes under composers Fabián Panisello (Spain), Philippe Leroux (France)  and Ivan Fedele (Italy), and conducting master classes under conductors Fabián Panisello (Spain) and Pierre-Andre Valade (France).

Since 2009, Cojocaru has been a full-time faculty member of composition and theory at the Academy.  He also serves as a board member at the Israeli Composers' League . Cojocaru's works are often recorded and played on the Israeli Radio as well as the Deutschlandradio kultur - Berlin, and Ljubljana Radio.

As a composer
Cojocaru's compositions range in various genres, from solo, vocal, small and large chamber ensemble to orchestral works. His works were premiered and performed at the Euro Classic Festival in Konzerthaus Berlin, the Arnold Schönberg Center - Vienna, the MATA Festival in New York, the 2015 International Society of Contemporary Music Festival (ISCM) in Ljubljana, the 2016 Asian Composers' League Festival (ACL) in Vietnam, the Israel Music Festival, the Desert Sounds Festival, the Galilee Voice of Music Festival and the Spring competitions .

Cojocaru received the Prime- Minister Award for Composers.

Cojocaru 's music has been performed by the Meitar Ensemble (Israel), the Israel Contemporary players, the Zeitfluss Ensemble (Austria), the Tempera Ensemble (Israel), the Tel Aviv Soloists Ensemble, the Israel Symphony Orchestra, the Israel Chamber Orchestra, the Israel Sinfonietta, the Israel Camerata-Jerusalem, the Israel Symphonette-Raa'nana, and the Israel Contemporary String Quartet

Cojocaru'sworks are published by the Israel Music Center (IMC), and the Israel Music Institute (IMI).

As a conductor
Cojocaru has performed with the Israel Chamber Orchestra, the Israel Sinfonietta, the Israel Camerata-Jerusalem, the Filarmonica de Stat Botoșani (Romania), the Haifa Symphony Orchestra, the Ashdod Symphony Orchestra, the NK Orchestra, the Israel Symphonette-Raa'nana, the Meitar ensemble, the Moran Singers Ensemble, and the Jerusalem Academy Orchestra,.

As an arranger
Cojocaru's works are performed regularly by the Israel Philharmonic Orchestra, the Jerusalem Symphony Orchestra, the Israel Symphony Orchestra, the Haifa Symphony Orchestra, the Israel Chamber Orchestra, The Israel Sinfonietta, the Tel Aviv Soloists Ensemble, the Raa'nana Symphonette, the NK Orchestra - Israel, the Tel Aviv Jazz Big Band, the Meitar ensemble, the Tempera ensemble, and others.

Popular music scene activity 
Since 1998, Cojocaru has Collaborated with  Gidi Gov, Alon Oleartchik, Yehuda Poliker, David Broza, Rami Klienstein, Rita, Yehudit Ravitz, Yoni Rechter, Shlomo Gronich, Eran Zur, Shlomi Shaban, Riki Gal, Yizhar Ashdot, David D'aor, Harel Skaat, Maurice El Medioni, and others.

Cojocaru also worked for several Israeli TV productions.

Awards, prizes and grants 
2018 – The Pais Grant for a commissioned composition
2017 – The Ministry of Culture Grant for a commissioned composition
2015 -  The Prime minister Award for composers 
2014 -  The Ministry of Culture Grant for a commissioned composition
2009 -  The Israel Sinfonietta Award for conductors
2005-2007 Excellence Scholarships  from the Jerusalem Academy of Music and Dance
2000 – The Tamuz Award (Israel Music Industry Official Prize) for best Instrumental performance in a recorded album

Works (selection)
	Five Intermezzi - for strings orchestra (2017)
	Still talking – conversations for percussionist & Orchestra (2017)
	Whence Comest Thou, Whither Wilt Thou Go – for chamber orchestra (2017)
	Hide and seek – for flute, clarinet, violin and cello (2016)
	Links.Metamorphosis – for large orchestra (2015)
	BBBeeezzz – for violin/ Viola, clarinet/ bass clarinet and piano (2015)
	Colors in the dust – for orchestra (2014)
	XoOx..! formus agitatus (the Septet version) – for flute, clarinet, violin, viola, cello, Percussion and piano (2014)
	XoOx..! formus agitatus (the Trio version) – for violin, Percussion and piano (2013)
	 Do you like Bill? - for flute, clarinet, violin, cello and piano (2013)
	Pulse – for piano and orchestra (2012)
	Betrayed – for nine musicians and narrator (2012)
	Urban inquiries – for six musicians (2012)
	“From the disappearing world” for string quartet (2009)
	"Chronicles of letters in a bottle" - three miniatures for small orchestra (2009)
	Elvish moods – for solo clarinet (2008)

References
 Personal website. http://www.ziv-cojocaru.com
 Ziv Cojocaru on ISCM.  
 https://matafestival.org/2013/ziv-cojocaru/
 International Society for Contemporary Music
  Știri Botoșani 15.11.2012

1977 births
Living people
Israeli composers
Israeli conductors (music)
Jewish composers
Israeli Jews
Israeli people of Romanian-Jewish descent
21st-century conductors (music)